Behling is a surname. Notable people with the surname include:

Christoph Behling, Swiss designer
Clarence Behling (1916–1994), Canadian ice hockey player
Guido Behling (born 1964), German sprint canoeist
Michael Evans Behling (born 1996), American actor
Robert Behling (born 1991), German slalom canoeist

See also
Mount Behling, a mountain of the Ross Dependency, Antarctica